Talak is a village in the Yadgir taluka of Yadgir district in Karnataka state, India. Talak is two and half kilometres by road northwest of the village of Hedgimadra, and 17 km by road from the town of Yadgir. The nearest railhead is in Yadgir.

Demographics 
At the 2001 census, Talak had 800 inhabitants, with 411 males and 389 females.

Notes

External links 
 

Villages in Yadgir district